Sphaeridia is a genus of springtails belonging to the family Sminthurididae.

The species of this genus are found in Europe and Northern America.

Species

Species:

Sphaeridia aserrata 
Sphaeridia asiatica 
Sphaeridia aspinosa

References

Collembola